Davina Bell is an Australian literary editor and children's writer. Her 2020 book, The End of the World Is Bigger than Love, won a New South Wales Premier's Literary Award in 2021.

Early life and education 
Bell was born in Perth, Western Australia. She graduated in law at university there, but then enrolled in Professional Writing and Editing at RMIT University in Melbourne.

Career 
With two others, Bell co-founded the literary journal Harvest and published its first edition in 2008.  

She was children's editor at Penguin, where she worked on their list with authors including Mem Fox and Margaret Wild. She subsequently moved Affirm Press to edit their children's list of writers including Alison Lester and Jane Godwin and then to Allen & Unwin where she work on their children and young-adult list.

Writing 
Bell wrote a series of four books set in 1918 about a West Australian girl called Alice, who wanted to be a dancer. The stories part of Penguin's Our Australian Girl series and were republished in 2014 as The Alice stories.

Her next book, The Underwater Fancy-Dress Parade, won the 2016 Australian Book Industry Awards Small Publishers' children's book of the year, as well as two book design awards for its illustrator/designer Allison Colpoys.

Her 2018 book, All the Ways to be Smart, won the Children's picture book of the year at the 2019 Australian Book Industry Awards.

At the 2021 New South Wales Premier's Literary Awards she won the Ethel Turner Prize for Young People's Literature for The End of the World Is Bigger than Love. She also won the 2021 CBCA Book of the Year for older readers for the same book.

 five of her books have been named Notable Books at the CBCA Book of the Year Awards and her works have been shortlisted for many other Australian literary awards.

Selected works

Stand-alone

The Alice series

Corner Park Clubhouse series

Lemonade Jones series

References

External links 

 

Living people
Year of birth missing (living people)
Writers from Perth, Western Australia
RMIT University alumni
Australian children's writers